Zana is a neighborhood in Ssabagabo Municipality, Kyaddondo County, Wakiso District, in Central Uganda. The place was named after a powerful business woman in 80s called Zana.

Location
Zanaa is bordered by Wankulukuku and Namasuba to the north, the Kampala-Entebbe Road and Najjanankumbi to the east, Lubowa to the south and Bunamwaya to the west.

The geographical coordinates of Zana are: 0°15'52.0"N, 32°33'26.0"E
(Latitude:0.264444; Longitude:32.557222).

Overview
Zana is one of the neighborhoods in Ssabagabo Municipality, in sub-urban Wakiso District, immediately south of Kampala, on the road to Entebbe, the location of Uganda's largest civilian and military airport, Entebbe International Airport.

The neighborhood is a middle-class mixed-use community, with large and medium-sized businesses along the Entebbe Road, with residences further away from the main road. Large businesses in the neighborhood, include a sales office and show room belonging to Uganda Baati Limited, a manufacturer of corrugated iron sheets and steel construction materials.

Another business in the neighborhood is the Life Line International Hospital, owned by Charles Ibingira, which opened in December 2018.

See also
 List of hospitals in Uganda
 Entebbe-Kampala Expressway

References

External links
 Namasuba, The secure haven As of 8 August 2016.

Ssabagabo
Populated places in Central Region, Uganda
Cities in the Great Rift Valley
Wakiso District